Əsədli or Asadly or  may refer to:
Əsədli, Jalilabad, Azerbaijan
Əsədli, Sabirabad, Azerbaijan

See also
Asadli, Iran